Sleeping Cupid:
 Sleeping Cupid, a painting by Caravaggio.
 Sleeping Cupid, a sculpture by Michelangelo.